Commerce has always been central to the growth of Isfahan, to the extent that the Safavid Shah Abbas I (1588–1629) effectively re-routed the Silk Road through Isfahan. As of 2019, economic transparency is lacking in Isfahan.
The Association of Mass Builders of Housing and Construction is an institution to encourage professionalism and create a suitable platform for investment. The Isfahan 1405 (2026) strategic plan is the sixth five-year plan of the city that has been uploaded on the municipal transparency site, and citizens can view it.

Production 
Since Safavid times, goldsmithing, carpet weaving, textile, and coppersmithing became popular in Isfahan.
Jey Oil Refining Company has a production and storage site in Isfahan. City is a furniture production hub in the country.
Some of the industrial districts within a 50-kilometer radius of the city are Jey Industrial Estate, Sagzi, Mohammad Abad, Dowlatabad, Isfahan.
Some of the markets are Shoes, Bags, Cars, Computers, Home appliances, Food, Pharmaceuticals and Gardening. 
Isfahan is known for the Isfahan rug.

Notable companies based in Isfahan include:
 Solomon Carpet
 Esfahan Steel Company
 Defense Industry Complex, Isfahan
 Isfahan Tree Research Centre
 Milk and Meat Company, Isfahan
 Sepahan Factory Town Complex
 Isfahan Refrigerated Produce Company
 Hoseynabad va Mahmudabad Industrial Estate of Isfahan
 Isfahan Airport Industries

Technology and infrastructure 

For reducing unemployment, according to Tasnim, it is recommended to build a dry port for goods, in special economics logistics east region of the city because of the airport, railway, highways, and roads.
Isfahan uranium processing facility is responsible for nuclear enrichment. Construction began in 1993.
Montazeri Power Plant is located in the north of Isfahan next to the Oil Refinery. The plant has eight units of 200 megawatts, with a production capacity of 1600 megawatts in total.
Startup Grind Isfahan hosts monthly startup events.
Isfahan Science and Technology Town is one of the technology parks in Iran, and 
Isfahan University of Medical Sciences Health Science and Technology Park opened 2019.

Recreation

Sport clubs 
 Foolad Mahan Isfahan BC
Sepahan Novin F.C.
Zob Ahan Isfahan BC
Giti Pasand Isfahan FSC
Sepahan Isfahan FC

Tourism

There are almost 150 hotels, Sarouyeh is a chosen tourism area in Isfahan Province.

Wealth and distribution
Some of the special markets inside the city are the medicinal herbs market, flower & plants market, fish market, meat market. There is a program to build Kowsar hypermarkets in every district by  Isfahan Municipality's Organization for Organizing Urban Jobs and Agricultural Products.
In 2019 680 child workers were identified by charity groups.
District 14 is one of the most impoverished places in the city with the most number of under 14 years old population and high crime ratio.
Oman Samani neighborhood with a population density of 222 people per hectare and 55% of immigrants has the highest population density in Isfahan.

Further reading
Creative industries: a case study of Isfahan, Iran
How much rich people in isfahan spend per month?

Gallery

See also
List of companies of Iran
List of economic laws in Iran
Ecology in Isfahan
Iranian labor law
Privatization in Iran
Social class in Iran
Trade in Iran's Safavid era

References

External links

Isfahan chamber of commerce, industry and mines
Isfahan Municipality's Organization for Organizing Urban Jobs and Agricultural Products
Organization for budget and management
Governorate investment portal
Isfahan department of commerce, industry and mines
Isfahan small industries & industry parks
Minister of science & technology
Minister of foreign affairs
national business license board portal
Isfahan standard department
https://isfahan.mrud.ir/
https://fdo.mui.ac.ir/

Isfahan